The Guam women's national under-18 basketball team is a national basketball team of Guam, administered by the Guam Basketball Confederation.

It represents the country in international under-18 (under age 18) women's  basketball competitions.

See also
Guam women's national basketball team
Guam men's national under-18 basketball team

References

External links
Guam Basketball Records at FIBA Archive

Basketball in Guam
Basketball teams in Guam
Women's national under-18 basketball teams
Basketball
Women's sports in Guam